Events in the year 1653 in Norway.

Incumbents
Monarch: Frederick III

Events
May - The Vardø witch trials ends. It resulted in the death of seventeen women by burning.

Full date unknown
 The Customs House is moved further down the Telemarksvassdraget from Skien to Porsgrunn, making the latter a thriving market town.
 The Cappelen Family emigrates to Norway from Northern Germany.
 Mandal takes its present name, after abandoning the name Vesterrisør.

Arts and literature

Births
2 April – Prince George of Denmark and Norway (d.1708)

Deaths
Peter Paulson Paus, provost (born 1590)